Waked is an Arabic surname, a variant of Waqid or Wajid (Arabic:  واقد), both meaning “brilliant” and/or “kindled”.

Notable people with the surname include:

Abdullah Al-Waked (born 1975), Saudi Arabian footballer
Amr Waked (born 1972), Egyptian actor
Sharif Waked (born 1964), Palestinian artist

See also
Wake (disambiguation)

Arabic-language surnames